Precarious work is a term that critics use to describe non-standard or temporary employment that may be poorly paid, insecure, unprotected, and unable to support a household. From this perspective, globalization, the shift from the manufacturing sector to the service sector, and the spread of information technology have created a new economy which demands flexibility in the workplace, resulting in the decline of the standard employment relationship, particularly for women. The characterization of temporary work as "precarious" is disputed by some scholars and entrepreneurs who see these changes as positive for individual workers.

Contrast with regular and temporary employment

The term "precarious work" is frequently associated with the following types of employment: Part-time jobs, self-employment, fixed-term work, temporary work, on-call work, and remote workers. Scholars and critics who use the term "precarious work" contrast it with the "standard employment relationship", which is the term they use to describe full-time, continuous employment where the employee works on their employer's premises or under the employer's supervision, under an employment contract of indefinite duration, with standardized working hours/weeks and social benefits such as pensions, unemployment benefits, and medical coverage. This "standard employment relationship" emerged after World War II, as men who completed their education would go on to work full-time for one employer their entire lives until their retirement at the age of 65. It did not typically describe women in the same time period, who would only work temporarily until they got married and had children, at which time they would withdraw from the workforce.

While many different kinds of part-time or limited-term jobs can be temporary, critics use the term "precarious" strictly to describe work that is uncertain, unpredictable, or offers little to no control over working hours or conditions. This characterization has been challenged by scholars focused on the agency that temporary work affords individual workers. However, many studies promoting individual agency focus on highly educated and skilled knowledge workers, rather than the full range of temporary workers.

Regulation

While increased flexibility in the marketplace and in employment relationships has created new opportunities for regulation, regulation intended explicitly to remediate precarious work often produces mixed results. The International Labour Organization (ILO) has developed standards for atypical and precarious employment, including the 1994 Convention Concerning Part-time Work, the 1996 Convention Concerning Home Work, and the 1999 "Decent Work" initiative.

See also 

 Contingent work
 Flexicurity
 Gig economy
 Labour market flexibility
 Precariat
 Workforce casualisation
 Zero-hour contract

References

Further reading
 Andranik S. Tangian "Is flexible work precarious? A study based on the 4th European survey of working conditions 2005", WSI-Diskussionspapier Nr. 153, Hans-Böckler-Stiftung June 2007

 Sonia McKay, Steve Jefferys, Anna Paraksevopoulou, Janoj Keles, "Study on Precarious work and social rights" Working Lives Research Institute, London Metropolitan University, April 2012
 

 
Community organizing
Corporate crime
Employment classifications
Ethically disputed working conditions
Feminism and social class
Global workforce
Labor relations
Labor disputes